The Harris's hawk (Parabuteo unicinctus), formerly known as the bay-winged hawk, dusky hawk, and sometimes a wolf hawk, and known in Latin America as peuco, is a medium-large bird of prey that breeds from the southwestern United States south to Chile, central Argentina, and Brazil. Birds are sometimes reported at large in Western Europe, especially Britain, but it is a popular species in falconry and these records almost invariably all refer to escapes from captivity.

The name is derived from the Greek para, meaning beside, near or like, and the Latin buteo, referring to a kind of buzzard; uni meaning once; and cinctus meaning girdled, referring to the white band at the tip of the tail. John James Audubon gave this bird its English name in honor of his ornithological companion, financial supporter, and friend Edward Harris.

The Harris's hawk is notable for its behavior of hunting cooperatively in packs consisting of tolerant groups, while other raptors often hunt alone. Harris hawks' social nature has been attributed to their intelligence, which makes them easy to train and have made them a popular bird for use in falconry.

Description

This medium-large hawk is roughly intermediate in size between a peregrine falcon (Falco peregrinus) and a red-tailed hawk (Buteo jamaicensis). These hawks have a brownish plumage, reddish shoulders and tail feathers with a white base and white tip.

They exhibit sexual dimorphism with the females being larger by about 35%. They have dark brown plumage with chestnut shoulders, wing linings, and thighs, white on the base and tip of the tail, long, yellow legs and a yellow cere. The vocalizations of the Harris's hawk are very harsh sounds.

The lifespan of the Harris's Hawk is 10-–12 years in the wild, 20–25 years in captivity.

Juvenile

The juvenile Harris's hawk is mostly streaked with buff, and appears much lighter than the dark adults. When in flight, the undersides of the juveniles' wings are buff-colored with brown streaking. They can look unlike adults at first glance, but the identical chestnut plumage is an aid for identification.

Subspecies
There are three subspecies of the Harris's hawk:

 P. u. superior: found in Baja California, Arizona, Sonora, and Sinaloa. P. u. superior was believed to have longer tails and wings and to be more blackish than P. u. harrisi. However, the sample size of the original study was quite small, with only five males and six females. Later research has concluded that there is not as strong a physical difference as was originally assumed. Other ecological differences, such as latitudinal cline were also brought up as arguments against the validity of the subspecies segmentation.
 P. u. harrisi: found in Texas, eastern Mexico, and much of Central America.
 P. u. unicinctus: found exclusively in South America. It is smaller than the North American subspecies.

Distribution and habitat
Harris's hawks live in sparse woodland and semi-desert, as well as marshes (with some trees) in some parts of their range (Howell and Webb 1995), including mangrove swamps, as in parts of their South American range. Harris's hawks are permanent residents and do not migrate. Important perches and nest supports are provided by scattered larger trees or other features (e.g., power poles, woodland edges, standing dead trees, live trees, and boulders, and saguaros).

The wild Harris's hawk population is declining due to habitat loss; however, under some circumstances, they have been known to move into developed areas.

Behaviour
This species occurs in relatively stable groups. A dominance hierarchy occurs in Harris's hawks, wherein the mature female is the dominant bird, followed by the adult male and then the young of previous years. Groups typically include from two to seven birds. Not only do birds cooperate in hunting, they also assist in the nesting process. No other bird of prey is known to hunt in groups as routinely as this species.

Breeding

They nest in small trees, shrubby growth, or cacti. The nests are often compact, made of sticks, plant roots, and stems, and are often lined with leaves, moss, bark and plant roots. They are built mainly by the female. There are usually two to four white to blueish white eggs sometimes with a speckling of pale brown or gray. The nestlings start out light buff, but in five to six days turn a rich brown.

Very often, there will be three hawks attending one nest: two males and one female. Whether or not this is polyandry is debated, as it may be confused with backstanding (one bird standing on another's back). The female does most of the incubation. The eggs hatch in 31 to 36 days. The young begin to explore outside the nest at 38 days, and fledge, or start to fly, at 45 to 50 days. The female sometimes breeds two or three times in a year. Young may stay with their parents for up to three years, helping to raise later broods. Nests are known to be predated by coyotes (Canis latrans), golden eagles (Aquila chrysaetos), red-tailed hawks (Buteo jamaicensis), great horned owls (Bubo virginianus) and flocks of common ravens (Corvus corax), predators possibly too formidable to be fully displaced by the Harris's hawk's cooperative nest defenses. No accounts show predation on adults in the United States and the Harris's hawk may be considered an apex predator, although presumably predators like eagles and great horned owls would be capable of killing them. In Chile, black-chested buzzard-eagles (Geranoaetus melanoleucus) are likely predators.

Feeding

The diet of the Harris's hawk consists of small creatures including birds, lizards, mammals, and large insects. Because it often hunts in groups, the Harris's hawk can also take down larger prey. The desert cottontail (Syvilagus auduboni), the leading prey species in the north of the Harris's hawk's range, usually weighs  or less. Undoubtedly because it pursues large prey often, this hawk has larger and stronger feet, with long talons, and a larger, more prominent hooked beak than most other raptors around its size.

In the Southwestern United States, the most common prey species (in descending order of prevalence) are desert cottontail (Syvilagus auduboni), eastern cottontail (Syvilagus floridanus), black-tailed jackrabbit (Lepus californicus), ground squirrels (Ammopsermophilus spp. and Spermophilus spp.), woodrats (Neotoma spp.), kangaroo rats (Dipodomys spp.), pocket gophers (Geomys and Thomomys spp.), Gambel's quail (Callipepla gambelii), scaled quail (C. squamata), northern bobwhite (Colinus virginianus), cactus wren (Campylorhynchus brunneicapillus), northern mockingbird (Mimus polyglottos), desert spiny lizards (Sceloporus magister), and skinks (Eumeces spp.) In the tropics, Harris's hawks have adapted to taking prey of several varieties, including those like chickens and European rabbits introduced by man. In Chile, the common degu (Octodon degus) makes up 67.5% of the prey.

Hunting
While most raptors are solitary, only coming together for breeding and migration, Harris's hawks will hunt in cooperative groups of two to six. This is believed to be an adaptation to the lack of prey in the desert climate in which they live. In one hunting technique, a small group flies ahead and scouts, then another group member flies ahead and scouts, and this continues until prey is bagged and shared. In another, all the hawks spread around the prey and one bird flushes it out. Harris's hawks will often chase prey on foot, and are quite fast on the ground and their long, yellow legs are adapted for this, as most hawks don't spend as much time on the ground. Groups of Harris's hawks tend to be more successful at capturing prey than lone hawks, with groups of two to four individuals having ~10% higher success rates per extra individual.

Relationship with humans

Falconry
Since about 1980, Harris's hawks have been increasingly used in falconry and are now the most popular hawks in the West (outside of Asia) for that purpose, as they are one of the easiest to train and the most social.

Trained Harris's hawks have been used to remove an unwanted pigeon population from London's Trafalgar Square, and from the tennis courts at Wimbledon.

Trained Harris's hawks have  been used for bird abatement by falconry experts in Canada and the United States at various locations including airports, resorts, landfill sites, and industrial sites.

In art
John James Audubon illustrated the Harris's hawk in The Birds of America (published in London, 1827–38) as Plate 392 with the title "Louisiana Hawk -Buteo harrisi". The image was engraved and colored by the Robert Havell, London workshops in 1837. The original watercolor by Audubon was purchased by the New York History Society where it remains to this day (January 2009).

References

External links

 Peregrine Fund page on Harris' hawk
 Harris's hawks in falconry (videos, Photo album, articles) 
 Harris' hawks hunting in pack (video)

Historical material
 John James Audubon.  "Louisiana Hawk", Ornithological Biography volume 5 (1839).  Illustration from Birds of America octavo edition, 1840.

Harris's hawk
Falconry
Birds of Central America
Birds of Mexico
Birds of prey
Birds of South America
Native birds of the Southwestern United States
Harris's hawk
Taxa named by Coenraad Jacob Temminck